Oriens, the dartlets, is a genus of grass skippers, butterflies in the subfamily Hesperiinae (Hesperiidae). The genus was described by William Harry Evans in 1932.

Species
Oriens alfurus (Plötz, 1885) – Celebes
Oriens californica (Scudder, 1872) – Philippines
Oriens fons Evans, 1949
Oriens paragola (de Nicéville & Martin, [1896]) – Sumatra
Oriens augustula (Herrich-Schäffer, 1869) – Fiji
Oriens goloides (Moore, [1881]) – Ceylon, India, Nepal, South China to Malay Peninsula. 
Oriens gola (Moore, 1877) – Ceylon, South India, Kumaon, Sikkim to Assam, Burma, Vietnam
Oriens concinna (Elwes & Edwards, 1897) – India (Shevaroys, Nilgiris, Palnis, Coorg)

Biology 
The larvae feed on grasses including Imperata, Oryza, and Paspalum.

References

Oriens Evans, 1932" at Markku Savela's Lepidoptera and Some Other Life Forms

Hesperiinae
Hesperiidae genera